is a Japanese Ambassador to Germany, previously to South Korea (2002–2005) and Singapore (2001). In February 2005 he sparked a controversy in South Korea when he stated that the Liancourt Rocks in the Sea of Japan, currently under South Korean administration, "historically and legally" belong to Japan.

See also
 List of Ambassadors from Japan to South Korea

References

Living people
Ambassadors of Japan to Germany
Ambassadors of Japan to South Korea
Ambassadors of Japan to Singapore
Itochu people
Year of birth missing (living people)